Simonsville is a ghost town in Clark County, Nevada, that was located on the east bank of the Muddy River west of the south end of the Overton Airport in the Moapa Valley.

History
Simonsville was originally called Mill Point for the grist mill first built there by James Leithead.  The name was changed to Simonsville in December 1865, named after Orrawell Simons who would build another mill there in 1866.  Simonsville was abandoned in 1870 like most of the Mormon farms and settlements in the Moapa Valley, due to a tax dispute with the Nevada state government, and it was never reoccupied.

Today
The site of Simonsville is occupied by more recent structures.

References 

Ghost towns in Clark County, Nevada
History of the Mojave Desert region
Populated places established in 1865
1865 establishments in Arizona Territory
Ghost towns in Nevada
Arizona Territory